Dharmojigudem is a village in Yadadri district in Telangana, India. It falls under Choutuppal mandal. Its part of Hyderabad Metropolitan Development Authority.

Schools
There is a Zilla Parsihad High School in the village.

References

Villages in Yadadri Bhuvanagiri district